Alves da Silva is a combined surname. Notable people with the surname include:

Adson Alves da Silva (born 1982), Brazilian footballer
Alexandre Alves da Silva (born 1981), Brazilian footballer
Cintia Alves da Silva, Brazilian linguist and semiotician
Daniel Alves da Silva (born 1983), Brazilian footballer
Eduardo Alves da Silva (born 1983), Brazilian born Croatian footballer
Giovane Alves da Silva (born 1982), Brazilian footballer
Pedro Alves da Silva (born 1981), Brazilian footballer
Paulo Ricardo Alves da Silva (born 1987), Brazilian footballer
Simone Alves da Silva (born 1984), Brazilian long-distance runner

See also
Alves
Silva

Portuguese-language surnames